Tabodwe is the eleventh month of the traditional Burmese calendar.

Festivals and observances
Full moon of Tabodwe
Harvest Festival
Mon National Day
Rakhine tug of war festival, Yatha Hswe Pwe.
Pagoda festivals
Alaungdaw Kathapa Pagoda Festival (Sagaing Region)
Shwe Settaw Pagoda Festival (Minbu Township, Magwe Region)
Kyaikkhauk Pagoda Festival (Thanlyin Township, Yangon Region)

Tabodwe symbols
Flower: Butea monosperma

References

See also
Burmese calendar
Festivals of Burma

Months of the Burmese calendar